The Health Wagon, also known as St. Mary's Health Wagon, is a nonprofit organization that has been providing free healthcare services to residents of the Appalachian Mountains of southwest Virginia since 1980. The organization was founded by Sister Bernadette “Bernie” Kenny of the Medical Missionaries of Mary, who initially delivered healthcare services to residents from her Volkswagen Beetle. 

The Health Wagon began as a small operation and has since grown to provide primary, specialty, dental, and vision care to the medically underserved in poverty-stricken areas of rural Appalachia. The organization operates three mobile units and two stationary clinics that service Virginia's Buchanan, Dickenson, Russell, Lee, Scott, and Wise counties (and the city of Norton) and visits 13 sites in Southwest Virginia.

Over the years, the Health Wagon has received national and international recognition and has been featured in media outlets such as 60 Minutes, CBS Nightly News, Inside Edition, the Washington Post, and the New York Times. The staff of the Health Wagon has presented at the United Nations and the World Health Organization.

The Health Wagon has been a valuable partner in delivering quality, affordable, and accessible healthcare to the medically underserved. The organization's mission is sustained by grants and donations from individuals, corporations, and foundations. Services are rendered free of charge to those in need.

Under the leadership of President and CEO Dr. Teresa Owens Tyson, DNP, MSN, FNP-BC, FAANP, the Health Wagon continues to meet the unique challenges of providing healthcare services to the medically underserved in rural Appalachia. The Health Wagon also hosts the largest health outreach of its kind in the nation (formerly Wise Remote Area Medical) and was an instrumental partner in the first-ever FAA-approved drone delivery of medications in the U.S.

History
In 1980, with the aid of St. Mary's Hospital of Norton, Sister Bernadette Kenny was able to cover the initial costs to distribute medication out of the back of her Volkswagen Beetle. The inception of the clinic began with her and continued to grow to provide primary and specialty care services to those in the secluded mountainous region of southwest Virginia. Dr. Teresa Tyson, the first staff recruit, increased their resources to become largely accessible and act as a safety net for the residents. Over the next three decades, the Health Wagon has acquired four mobile van units and established two stationary clinics.

Presently, the clinic is a $1.6 million nonprofit.

Clinic Structure
The clinic staff structure consists of Doctors of Nursing Practitioners, Family Nurse Practitioners, a Dentist, Registered Nurses, Licensed Practical Nurses, an Outreach Coordinator, a Director of Operations, an Administrative Assistant, a Director of Development, a IT Director, and Receptionists”. As of 2019, they have employed their first full-time dentist, Olivia Stallard.

Geography and Population

The southwest portion of Virginia defines itself by its location in the Central Appalachian Mountains. The geographical isolation from its eastern counterparts has contributed to a number of barriers. Among these challenges are high levels of substance abuse, job shortages, declining populations, healthcare professional shortages, food insecurity, low literacy/education, and transportation limitations. The area has been heavily influenced by the coal mining industry and its decline over the years.

As of January 1, 2019, the state of Virginia has adopted and implemented Medicaid Expansion.

Funding and Partnerships
Although St. Mary's Hospital was the Health Wagon's initial source for funding, financial support is primarily contracted through grant work, foundations and private contributions. Of these numerous funding opportunities, a Federal Office of Rural Health Policy grant supported the clinic from 2009 to 2012. The federal funds allowed the clinic to supplement salaries, improve community education resources, and the inclusion of an electronical medical records system. Through multiple established partnerships with organizations and universities, the Health Wagon has been able to offer services, not locally available. Partnering with the University of Virginia, a telemedicine connection was made possible through the Mid-Atlantic Telehealth Resource Center. Since 2004, it has enabled the Health Wagon to offer secondary and tertiary services, such as “pulmonology, radiology, cardiology, endocrinology, ostomy, nephrology, ear nose and throat, women’s health (colposcopy), mental health and dermatology”. The AstraZeneca Healthcare Foundation has been a repeat supporter of the Health Wagon. The money granted goes on to support their Expansion of Heart Health 1, 2, 3. Comprehensive Cardiovascular Disease Initiative for Diabetes Mellitus, Metabolic Syndrome and Obesity program.

The first ever FAA-approved Flirtey delivery drone made its debut pharmaceutical drop in 2015 at the Wise County Fairgrounds during the largest free medical outreach in the nation, M7 Move Mountains Medical Mission (Formally Wise RAM). It now is kept at the Smithsonian.

By teaming up with Remote Area Medical, the Health Wagon was able to initiate an annual three-day community health fair. However, in a July 13, 2019 announcement, the Health Wagon announced their promoted position as the primary host in a renamed event, Move Mountains Medical Mission (M7). This announcement comes after nearly twenty years of joint collaboration. The Philips Foundation, CVS Pharmacy and Aetna Foundation have continuously supported this outreach event and have gone as far as donating an ultrasound machine for the mobile chest X-ray van along with personal and home goods for those in attendance.

Appalachian Regional Commission is currently funding half a million dollars for the construction of a 5,000 square foot clinic in Dickenson County.

In the Media
The Health Wagon has garnered recognition including interviews from media that include: 
60 Minutes, 
Nightline, 
CBS Nightly News, 
Inside Edition, 
Washington Post, 
New York Times, 
U.S. News
The RACE
Governing
Lifetime, “Her America”, 
NBC News. 
This also includes presentations given by the Executive and Clinical Directors at the United Nations and the World Health Organization.

References 

Healthcare in Virginia